Jasenovi Potoci is a settlement located in the Municipality of Mrkonjić Grad, of the Republika Srpska Entity in Bosnia and Herzegovina. It Borders the Livno Canton (FBiH) and is located under the Dinaric Alps.

Geography 
One of the three springs of the Sana River can be found in the settlement area.

Etymology 
The Settlement's name, Jasenovi Potoci derives from local ash trees and streams which are largely prevalent in this area.

Demographics 
According to the official census of 1991, Jasenovi Potoci had 284 residents, all of them were Serbs.

Gallery

References

Literature 

Populated places in Mrkonjić Grad